Weapons of Tomorrow is the sixth studio album by the American thrash metal band Warbringer. Following the success of Woe to the Vanquished (2017), it is the first album to feature Chase Bryant on bass. During its first week of release, it reached #63 in the Belgian charts.

Background and lyrics
Speaking about the album, lead singer John Kevill said he sees this album as "a 2.0 stage of the band" and that "this is, as far as what we've achieved as a band, the definitive era." He drew inspiration from many sources for the album, including Joseph Conrad's Heart of Darkness and Victor Hugo's The Hunchback of Notre-Dame. In reference to the song Heart of Darkness, "At the heart of all of this large scale human evil that you get is this question of if you could rule and dominate your fellow man, would you? I think that the ugly true answer is that for a lot of people, most people believe yes is the answer. [...] The song is about unpacking all that and dealing with the fact that that's the world we're standing on."

Release
The album's title and artwork were revealed in February 2020, along with the release of a rerecording of 2019's single Firepower Kills for the album. In the months following the release of the album, Napalm Records released a documentary about the album on YouTube in which the band discussed the history of each song.

Critical reception

Dom Lawson of Blabbermouth praised the "imaginative spirit" and "flat-out, swivel-eyed thrash fucking metal", saying "[the album] feels like the kind of thrash metal album that bands used to make in the genre's glory days." Fraser Wilson of Distorted Sound lauded the opening track Firepower Kills, saying "This is modern thrash at its very best." Calling the album "lyrically stunning and musically eviscerating", he highlighted Heart of Darkness as "a real standout", saying it "showcases the sonic range of the band." Jonathan Smith of Sonic Perspectives called the album "genius" and "stylistically intricate", saying "Warbringer have definitely hit a sweet spot" with the album. He highlighted "Crushed Beneath The Tracks' and "Power Unsurpassed", calling them "punchy riff monsters."

Track listing
All lyrics by John Kevill

Personnel
Warbringer
John Kevill – lead vocals
Chase Becker – guitars
Adam Carroll - guitars
Chase Bryant – bass
Carlos Cruz – drums

Additional personnel
Mike Plotnikoff - production
Zack Ohren - mixing
Justin Schturtz - mastering
Andreas Marschall - artwork

Charts

References 

Warbringer albums
2020 albums
Napalm Records albums